Onur Çenik (born September 24, 1992) is a Turkish footballer who last played for Tepecikspor.

External links
 
 
 

1992 births
Living people
Turkish footballers
Turkey youth international footballers
German people of Turkish descent
German footballers
Germany youth international footballers
Borussia Dortmund II players
Kardemir Karabükspor footballers
3. Liga players
Süper Lig players
Association football defenders
Sportspeople from Hagen
Footballers from North Rhine-Westphalia